Long Trip Alone is the third studio album by American country music singer Dierks Bentley.  It was released October 17, 2006 via Capitol Records Nashville. The album produced four singles on the U.S. Billboard Hot Country Songs charts: "Every Mile a Memory", the title track, "Free and Easy (Down the Road I Go)", and "Trying to Stop Your Leaving". All singles went to the Top 10 on the chart. "Ever Mile a Memory" and "Free and Easy (Down the Road I Go)" both reached number one, the title track peaked at number 10, and "Trying to Stop Your Leaving" went to number 5. Brett Beavers, Bentley’s producer, helped Bentley co-write all of the songs on the album. The album peaked at number 5 on the U.S. Billboard 200 and at number 1 on the Top Country Albums chart. It was certified gold by the Recording Industry Association of America (RIAA).

Track listing

Personnel
Dierks Bentley - lead vocals
Steve Brewster - drums
Jimmy Carter - bass guitar
J.T. Corenflos - electric guitar
Terry Eldredge - acoustic guitar and background vocals on "Prodigal Son's Prayer"
Rob Harrington - bass guitar on "Free and Easy (Down the Road I Go)"
Aubrey Haynie - fiddle
Inmates at Charles Bass Correctional Complex - foot stomping on "Prodigal Son's Prayer"
Rod Janzen - electric guitar on "Free and Easy (Down the Road I Go)"
Jamie Johnson - vocals on "Prodigal Son's Prayer"
Jimmy Mattingly - fiddle on "Prodigal Son's Prayer"
Steve Misamore - drums on "Free and Easy (Down the Road I Go)"
Gary Morse - lap steel guitar, pedal steel guitar
Danny Roberts - mandolin on "Prodigal Son's Prayer"
Tim Sargeant- pedal steel guitar on "Free and Easy (Down the Road I Go)"
Terry Smith - upright bass on "Pridigal Son's Prayer"
Bryan Sutton - banjo, bouzouki, acoustic guitar, mandolin
David Talbot - banjo on "Prodigal Son's Prayer"
Russell Terrell - background vocals

Chart performance

Weekly charts

Year-end charts

Singles

Certifications

References

2006 albums 
Albums produced by Brett Beavers
Capitol Records Nashville albums
Dierks Bentley albums